Tell Beydar is a village and ancient site in the modern Al-Hasakah Governorate, Syria. It was the Ancient Near Eastern
city of Nabada. It is connected by road to Al-Darbasiyah on the Turkish border in the north.

History
Nabada was first settled during the  Early Dynastic Period circa 2600 BC. By around 2500 BC a medium-sized independent city-state had developed. At that point, it became a provincial capital under the kingdom centered at Nagar, now Tell Brak. After the Jezirah region was conquered by the Akkadians, Nabada became an outpost of that empire. The city was then abandoned until
re-occupied for a time circa 1400 BC by the Hurrians and again in the Neo-Assyrian and Hellenistic periods.

Archaeology
A much later  Hurrian/Neo-Assyrian site lies at the base of the tell. At the top of the tell there is a Hellenistic settlement. Tell Beydar was excavated for 17 seasons, beginning in 1992 and ending in 2010, by a joint Syrian and European team made up of the European Centre for Upper Mesopotamian Studies and the Directorate-General of Antiquities and Museums of Syria. There were also several restoration seasons. The team leads are Marc Lebeau and Antoine Suleiman.

 A number of other institutions, including the Oriental Institute of the University of Chicago have also participated. Besides the architectural and pottery findings from the excavation, almost 250 early cuneiform tablets and fragments were recovered, dating from the pre-sargonic period. The tablets are agricultural records for the most part, but do establish some synchronisms with Tell Brak. The language used in the tablets is a variant of the Semitic Akkadian language and the personal names referred to were also Semitic.

A number of clay sealings have also been recovered. Finds from Tell Beydar are on display in the Deir ez-Zor Museum.

See also
Cities of the ancient Near East
Tell Chuera

Notes

Further reading
Peter M. M. G. Akkermans, Glenn M. Schwartz, The Archaeology of Syria: From Complex Hunter-Gatherers to Early Urban Societies (c.16,000-300 BC), Cambridge University Press, 2004, 
F. Ismail, W. Sallaberger, P. Talon, K. Van Lerberghe, Administrative Documents from Tell Beydar, Seasons 1993-1995, Brepols Publishers, 1997, 
L. Milano, W. Sallaberger, P. Talon, K. Van Lerberghe, Third Millennium Cuneiform Texts from Tell Beydar, Seasons 1996-2002, Brepols Publishers, 2004, 
Joachim Bretschneider, Nabada: The Buried City, Scientific American, vol. 283, pp 74–81, 2000
K. Van Lerberghe and G. Voet, Tell Beydar: Environmental and Technical Studies, Brepols, 2001,

External links

Tell Beydar excavation web site
Oriental Institute Tell Beydar survey note from 97-98 season
 Oriental Institute Tell Beydar survey note from 98-99 season

26th-century BC establishments
Populated places established in the 3rd millennium BC
Bronze Age sites in Syria
Former populated places in Syria
Archaeological sites in al-Hasakah Governorate
Tells (archaeology)
Early Dynastic Period (Mesopotamia)
City-states